Badr is a series of satellites operated by Pakistan. The first satellite Badr-1, was launched in July 1990.

It was the first SUPARCO engineered object to orbit the Earth. That launch took place on 16 July 1990 as part of the International Frequency Registration Bureau. The Urdu language word "Badr", literally means "Full Moon", and its launch vehicle was Chinese Long March 2 space rocket Long March 2E.

The Badr series consisted of two satellites. Both were developed by SUPARCO. The Badr-A satellite successfully completed its designated life. Badr-B is the second spacecraft and the first Earth observation satellite, by the Pakistan, launched into Earth orbit on 10 December 2001 at 17:19:00 UTC by the Space & Upper Atmosphere Research Commission (SUPARCO). The Badr program was decommissioned in 2012 after the Badr-B completed its successful designated life in an Earth's orbit. The Pakistan Remote Sensing Satellite system has replaced the Badr-Satellite program since 2018.

References

External links 
 Badr Program
 Satellite Program

Science and technology in Pakistan
Badr satellites
Robots of Pakistan
SUPARCO missions